Umonhon Nation (Omaha Nation) Public School is a public school in Macy, Nebraska, United States, the center of tribal government for the Omaha.

History

Campus

A main building and four outlying buildings are divided into three grade levels: K-5 (elementary), 6-7-8 (middle school) and 9-12 (high school).

Curriculum

Omaha Nation is a school-wide Title I school and has Success for All Reading and Math in the elementary school and Expeditionary Learning in the high school as Comprehensive School Reform projects.

Extracurricular activities
Omaha Nation student groups and activities include band, class officers and activities, newspaper, science fair, ski club, and student council.

The school's teams, known as the Omaha Nation Chiefs, compete in Nebraska School Activities Association size classification D, used for the smallest schools in the state. Teams are fielded in basketball, football, track, volleyball, and weightlifting.

References

Omaha (Native American) people
Public high schools in Nebraska
Public middle schools in Nebraska
Public elementary schools in Nebraska
Schools in Thurston County, Nebraska